David Sisco (June 26, 1937 – July 25, 2016) was a  NASCAR Winston Cup Series driver who ran 133 races from 1971 to 1977, and was the 1969 Nashville Fairgrounds track champion.

Career
Sisco also managed to earn $251,359 in his seven-year NASCAR career ($ when considering inflation ). His average starting position is 22nd place while he managed to finish in 19th place on average.
Prior to 1971, Sisco participated in a select number of late model stock car races and was the champion of one of them in 1969.

The type of tracks that best favored Sisco were flat tracks; where he would finish an average of 13th place. He did not excel on restrictor plate tracks, however, and a finish of 23rd place would become routine for Sisco during his NASCAR Cup Series career.

Motorsports career results

NASCAR
(key) (Bold – Pole position awarded by qualifying time. Italics – Pole position earned by points standings or practice time. * – Most laps led.)

Grand National Series

Winston Cup Series

Daytona 500

References

1937 births
2016 deaths
NASCAR drivers
Sportspeople from Nashville, Tennessee
Racing drivers from Tennessee
People from Hohenwald, Tennessee